Cobitis vettonica is a species of ray-finned fish in the family Cobitidae.
It is found only in Spain.
Its natural habitats are rivers and intermittent rivers.
It is threatened by habitat loss.

References

Sources

Cobitis
Endemic fish of the Iberian Peninsula
Fish described in 1997
Taxonomy articles created by Polbot